"O Land of Beauty!" is the national anthem of the Federation of Saint Kitts and Nevis. Written and composed by Kenrick Georges, it was officially adopted as the national anthem of the newly independent nation in 1983, when the federation received its independence from the United Kingdom.

History
In February 1983, the government of Saint Kitts and Nevis announced a competition to find a national anthem and requested submissions. The announcement appeared in The Democrat Newspaper, and the deadline was 31 March 1983 at 4:00 pm.

Kenrick Georges (1955–2019), a trumpeter and arranger for a popular brass band, decided to compose a submission on the last day at 2:00 am. He completed the composition in four hours. An hour later, he took it to Greenlands piano teacher Mrs. Gumbs to record a piano performance of it. After a cassette recording was made, Georges submitted it the same day.

On 3 June 1983, Chairperson of the National Anthem Sub-Committee Pamela Wall announced the winner of the competition. Out of 45 entries, Georges' entry had won, with the committee feeling that it would "stand the test of time." The three other members of the Sub-Committee were Stanley Amory, Lorna Edwards and Lilith Kelsick.

On Saint Kitts and Nevis's first independence day, 19 September 1983, Prime Minister Kennedy Simmonds awarded Georges for his contribution as composer and writer of the national anthem. Georges stated in a 2008 interview that he considered writing the anthem the high point of his musical career. He stated that the idea behind the lyrics was to call for citizens to see the country "for the best of what it was and maintain that as we go along." He described the overall concept as, "Let’s keep St. Kitts and Nevis as it is with respect to the best of what we have between us."

Lyrics

References

External links
Information, links and streaming audio for the St. Kitts and Nevis national anthem (archive link)

National symbols of Saint Kitts and Nevis
Saint Kitts and Nevis music
National anthems
North American anthems
Saint Kitts and Nevis songs
National anthem compositions in B-flat major